Petropavlovka is a rural locality (a village) and the administrative center of Petropavlovsky Selsoviet, Askinsky District, Bashkortostan, Russia. The population was 184 as of 2010. There are 6 streets.

Geography 
Petropavlovka is located 12 km east of Askino (the district's administrative centre) by road. Davlyatovka is the nearest rural locality.

References 

Rural localities in Askinsky District